Azmat may refer to:

Given name
 S. Azmat Hassan, Pakistani Ambassador
 Azmat Rana (1951–2015), Pakistani cricketer

Surname
 Ali Azmat (born 1970), Pakistani musician
 Sadia Azmat (born 1987), English stand-up comedian of Pakistani descent

See also
 Shahbaz Azmat Khel
 PNS Azmat

Pakistani masculine given names